400px

This is a list of the wool, cotton and other textile mills in South Yorkshire, England.

Ardsley (Barnsley)

Barnsley

Barugh (Darton; Barnsley)

Cudworth

Dodworth

Oxspring

Thurlstone (Penistone)

References

Footnotes

The National Monument Record is a legacy numbering system maintained 
by English Heritage. Further details on each mill may be obtained from this url. http://yorkshire.u08.eu/

Notes

Bibliography

External links

South Yorkshire
 
South Yorkshire
Lists of buildings and structures in South Yorkshire
South Yorkshire
History of the textile industry
Industrial Revolution in England